31st Group may refer to:

 31 Canadian Brigade Group, a unit of the Canadian Army
 Marine Aircraft Group 31, a unit of the United States Marine Corps
 31st Operations Group, a unit of the United States Air Force

See also
 31st Division (disambiguation)
 31st Brigade (disambiguation)
 31st Regiment (disambiguation)
 31st Battalion (disambiguation)
 31st Squadron (disambiguation)